The 1985 Pukekohe 500 (known as the Nissan Sport 500 for sponsorship reasons) was an endurance race for Group A touring cars held at the Pukekohe Park Raceway in New Zealand on 3 February 1985. The race was the second and final round of the 1985 Nissan Sports Series. The race, held over 143 laps of the 2.841 km (1.765 mi) circuit for a total of 406 km (252 mi).

The race, held a week after the Wellington 500, was won by New Zealand drivers Neville Crichton and Wayne Wilkinson driving a BMW 635 CSi from the Tom Walkinshaw Racing Rover Vitesse of Tom Walkinshaw and Win Percy with Kiwis Neal Lowe and Kent Baigent finishing third in their BMW 635.

After finishing third in Wellington, the win saw Crichton and Wilkinson as co-winners of the Nissan Sports Series.

The Nissan Sport Series was run to the FIA's international Group A rules and provided a number of Australian teams, including the famed Holden Dealer Team, to get some racing laps in their new cars before the 1985 Australian Touring Car Championship after changing from the locally developed Group C rules at the end of 1984.

Results

* The event attracted 20 entries and 19 starters.

Notes
 Pole Position: #2 Tom Walkinshaw, Rover Vitesse - 1:29.80
 Fastest Lap: N/A
 Race Time: N/A

References

See also
James Hardie 1000, 1985/86
The Australian Racing History of Ford, 1989
The Official Racing History of Holden, 1988

Nissan Sport 500
Auto races in New Zealand
Touring car races
February 1985 sports events in New Zealand